István Lovrics (6 July 1927 – 13 April 1990) was a Hungarian basketball player. He competed in the men's tournament at the 1948 Summer Olympics.

References

External links
 

1927 births
1990 deaths
Hungarian men's basketball players
Olympic basketball players of Hungary
Basketball players at the 1948 Summer Olympics
Sportspeople from Pécs